Marcus Antonius Polemon (c. 90 – 144 AD) or Antonius Polemon, also known as Polemon of Smyrna or Polemon of Laodicea, was a sophist who lived in the 2nd century.

Early life
Polemon was Anatolian Greek from a family of Roman consular rank. He was the grandson of Polemon II of Pontus.

He was born in Laodicea on the Lycus in Phrygia (modern Turkey), however, he spent a great part of his life in Smyrna (modern İzmir, Turkey). From early manhood, he received civic honors from the citizens of Smyrna for his services to the city.

In Smyrna he was educated by Scopelianos of Klazomenai. He then attended the school of Timocrates of Heracleia for four years. After that he travelled to Bithynia to learn from the Sophist Dio Chrysostom.

Career
Polemon was a master of rhetoric, a prominent member of the Second Sophistic. He was favored by several Roman Emperors. Trajan is said to have granted him the privilege of free travel wherever he wished; Hadrian extended that privilege to Polemon's posterity. Hadrian not only admitted he ruled with Polemon's advice, but Polemon accompanied the emperor during his travels in Greece and Asia Minor. When his enemies accused Polemon of spending funds Hadrian had given him to benefit the city of Smyrna, the emperor defended the sophist with a letter declaring that Polemon had rendered Hadrian an account of the moneys entrusted to him. Polemon gave the dedicatory oration to Hadrian's Temple of Olympian Zeus in Athens, which G.W. Bowersock speculates was "an embarrassing repudiation of the obvious person for the occasion, Herodes Atticus. There is a famous story of his arrogant behavior towards Antoninus Pius, whom he threw out of his house at midnight when Antoninus was the newly arrived Governor of Asia.

Three times he headed a legation dispatched by Smyrna to the emperor. Under Hadrian he was made strategos, and subsequently appointed strategos for life. He was a priest of Dionysos and agonothetes of the athletic competitions that took place in Smyrna in honour of the emperor Hadrian. Owing to Polemon's rhetorical skills the emperor stopped favoring Ephesos and endowed Smyrna with 10 million drachmae, which financed the building of a new grain market, a gymnasium, and a temple.

Polemon founded in Smyrna one of the foremost schools of rhetoric.. His style of oratory was imposing rather than pleasing; however his character was haughty and reserved.

Later life
In his later years, Polemon suffered from arthritis. At the age of 56 and no longer able to stand the pain, he ordered his servants to lock him in his family tomb. When his friends and family begged him not to commit suicide in this manner, he said, "Give me another body and I shall come forth." There, he most likely died from either starvation or dehydration.

Works
Polemon's treatise on physiognomy is preserved in a 14th-century Arabic translation. The only fully surviving works of Polemon are his funeral orations for the Athenians generals Callimachus and Cynaegirus, who died at the Battle of Marathon in 490 BC. These orations are titled logoi epitaphioi (epitaphs). His rhetorical compositions were subjects that were taken from Athenian history.

References

Seeing the Face, Seeing the Soul: Polemon's Physiognomy from Classical Antiquity to Medieval Islam, edited by Simon Swain, Oxford University Press (2007); includes English translations of the major surviving Greek, Latin, and Arabic versions of Polemon's Physiognomy.
M. W. Gleason, Making Men: Sophists and Self-Presentation in Ancient Rome, Princeton (1995).
M. D. Campanile, "Note sul bios de Polemone", Studi ellenistici, 12 (1999), 269–315.
Dictionary of Greek and Roman Biography and Mythology

144 deaths
Roman-era Sophists
Physiognomists
Roman Olympia
Ancient Smyrna
Roman Phrygia
Ancient Greeks who committed suicide
2nd-century Romans
Antonii